"Dinner with Gershwin" is a song written by Brenda Russell. It was first recorded by Donna Summer in 1987, which Russell co-produced with Richard Perry.

"Dinner with Gershwin" was the first single off Summer's All Systems Go album which was Summer's first album of new material released in three years. The song was released in August 1987 by Geffen Records. "Dinner with Gershwin" returned Summer to the Billboard R&B Top Ten - at number 10 - for a final time but became the first lead single off a Donna Summer album of new material since 1978 to fall short of the Pop Top 40, peaking at number 48.

"Dinner with Gershwin" was better received on the UK charts entering the Top 30 in November 1987, with Summer's 19 November appearance on Top of the Pops - her first - assisting the track to a number 13 peak.

The song was edited from the original album version for its release as a single, and the 12" edition also contained an exclusive non-album track called "Tearin' Down the Walls."

Brenda Russell later recorded her own version of the song for her 1990 album Kiss Me with the Wind.

Track listing
7" - Geffen Records 7-28418 / Warner Bros. - 258 237-7
 "Dinner with Gershwin" – 4:12
 "Dinner with Gershwin (Instrumental)" – 4:52

12" - Warner Bros. U 8237 T
 "Dinner with Gershwin (Extended Version)" – 7:43
 "Dinner with Gershwin (LP Version)" – 4:35
 "Tearing Down the Walls" – 3:59
 Also released as a picture disc (U 8237 TP)

Official Versions
 Album Version (4:38)
 7" Version (4:12)
 Extended Version (7:43)
 Instrumental (4:52)
 Special Edited Dance Mix (4:36)

Personnel 
 Donna Sunmer – lead vocals 
 Steve Lindsey – acoustic piano, synthesizers, organ, drum programming
 Brenda Russell – additional synthesizers, backing vocals
 Howie Rice – clavinet
 Stanley Clarke –  clavinet concept
 Larry Klein – additional synthesizer programming, fretless bass
 Donald Griffin – guitar
 Collyer Spreen – percussion
 Terral (Terry) Santiel – additional percussion
 Gary Herbig – clarinet
 Maxi Anderson – backing vocals 
 Bunny Hull – backing vocals 
 Joe Turano – backing vocals 

Production Credits
 Richard Perry – producer
 Brenda Russell – associate producer
 Glen Holguin – engineer, mixing 
 Jim Tract – mixing 
 Steve Peck – additional engineer
 Ken Felton – second engineer 
 Scott Maddox – second engineer 
 Craig Miller – second engineer

Chart positions

References

1987 singles
Donna Summer songs
Brenda Russell songs
Dance-pop songs
Songs written by Brenda Russell
1987 songs
Geffen Records singles
Warner Records singles
Song recordings produced by Richard Perry